Hein Seyerling is a paralympic athlete from South Africa competing mainly in category F20 high jump events.

Hein competed in Sydney at the 2000 Summer Paralympics winning a bronze medal in the high jump.

References

Paralympic athletes of South Africa
Athletes (track and field) at the 2000 Summer Paralympics
Paralympic bronze medalists for South Africa
Living people
Medalists at the 2000 Summer Paralympics
Year of birth missing (living people)
Paralympic medalists in athletics (track and field)
South African male high jumpers